Don't Sting the Mosquito is a 1967 Italian "musicarello" film directed by Lina Wertmüller (under the stage name George H. Brown). It is the sequel of Rita the Mosquito.

Cast 

 Rita Pavone: Rita Santangelo 
 Giancarlo Giannini: Paolo Randi 
 Giulietta Masina: Maria Cristina 
 Romolo Valli: Bartolomeo Santangelo 
 Peppino De Filippo: Carmelo 
 Enrico Viarisio: General 
 Mita Medici: Vanessa 
 Raffaele Pisu: Sergeant  
 Giusi Raspani Dandolo: Director
 Caterina Boratto: Marchesa Filangeri  
 Ugo Fangareggi: Wolfang
 Teddy Reno:  Himself  
 Pietro De Vico

References

External links

1967 films
1967 musical comedy films
Films directed by Lina Wertmüller
Musicarelli
Italian sequel films
1960s Italian films